Ctenotus kutjupa  is a species of skink found in Western Australia, Northern Territory, and South Australia.

References

kutjupa
Reptiles described in 2022